Paul Goerg is a Champagne producer based in the Vertus region of Champagne. The co-operative, founded in 1950, produces both vintage and non-vintage cuvee as well as a blanc de blancs Chardonnay Champagne.

See also
 List of Champagne houses

References

External links
Official website

Champagne producers